Asya may refer to:

People
Asya (singer) (born 1965), Turkish singer
Asya, ring name of  American bodybuilder, model and professional wrestler Christi Wolf
Asya Abdullah (born 1971), Kurdish politician, co-chairwoman of the Democratic Union Party (PYD)
Asya Branch (born 1998), American beauty pageant titleholder and Miss USA 2020 winner
Asya Bussie (born 1991), American basketball player
Asya Miller (born 1979), American goalball player
Asya Pereltsvaig (born 1972), Russian linguist
Asya Saavedra, founding member of the music group Smoosh renamed Chaos Chaos

Arts and entertainment
Asya (1994 album), self-titled 1994 album by Turkish singer Asya
Asya (1996 album), self-titled 1996 album by Turkish singer Asya
Asya, a novella by Ivan Turgenev
Asya (film), a 1977 Soviet drama film
The Story of Asya Klyachina, also known as Asya's Happiness and Asya Klyachina's Story, 1966 Soviet movie

Others
Bank Asya, Turkish private finance house
Asya (given name), the given name

See also 
 Asia (disambiguation)
 Assia (disambiguation)
 ASJA (disambiguation)

Turkish feminine given names